Silver Comes Through is a 1927 American silent Western film directed by Lloyd Ingraham and starring Fred Thomson, Edna Murphy, and William Courtright.

Cast
 Fred Thomson as Fred 
 Edna Murphy as Lucindy 
 William Courtright as Zeke 
 Harry Woods as Stanton 
 Mathilde Brundage as Mrs. Bryce-Collins
 Silver King the Horse as Silver, Fred's Horse

References

Bibliography
 Donald W. McCaffrey & Christopher P. Jacobs. Guide to the Silent Years of American Cinema. Greenwood Publishing, 1999.

External links
 

1927 films
1927 Western (genre) films
American black-and-white films
Films directed by Lloyd Ingraham
Film Booking Offices of America films
Silent American Western (genre) films
1920s English-language films
1920s American films